Solar Observatory Tower Meudon is a 36.47 metre tall tower built of reinforced concrete on the area of Meudon Observatory in Meudon, France, which has in its interior a spectrograph for examination of the sun. Solar Observatory Tower Meudon was built in 1964-65, and is a solar tower, a type of solar telescope. It has a shaft diameter of 6.6 metres. In a height of 30.57 metres it has an observatory floor with 18.4 metre diameter. The shaft of the tower consists of two concrete tubes which are separated by a 10 centimetre wide air spelt, in order to avoid wind induced vibrations.

The telescope has a 60 cm aperture.

Sources
 Turmbauwerke, Bauverlag GmbH, Wiesbaden (Deutschland), 1966

See also
 Paris Observatory
 List of towers
 List of solar telescopes
Meudon Great Refractor (nearby telescope facility dating to 1891)

External links
 Skyscraperpage.com
 History of the Observatory at Meudon

Astronomical observatories in France
Solar telescopes
Paris Observatory